Bernard Smith, (July 5, 1776July 16, 1835) was a Representative from New Jersey.

He was born in Morristown, New Jersey. After completing preparatory studies he was collector of customs in 1809 and 1810. He was postmaster of New Brunswick 1810-1819.

He was elected as a Democratic-Republican to the Sixteenth Congress (March 4, 1819 – March 3, 1821). He did not seek renomination in 1820. He was  appointed register of the land office at Little Rock, Arkansas in 1821, and settled in that state. He was secretary to the governor of Arkansas 1825-1828; appointed by Governor George Izard as subagent of the Quapaw in 1825, and served until his death in Little Rock on July 16, 1835. He is interred in Mount Holly Cemetery.

Notes
Information found on public domain website of Bioguide of US Congress.

References

1776 births
1835 deaths
United States Indian agents
Democratic-Republican Party members of the United States House of Representatives from New Jersey
Burials in New Jersey